Frank J. Fabozzi is an American economist, educator, writer, and investor, currently Professor of Practice at The Johns Hopkins University Carey Business School and a Member of Edhec Risk Institute. He was previously a Professor of Finance at EDHEC Business School, Professor in the Practice of Finance and Becton Fellow in the Yale School of Management, and a Visiting Professor of Finance at the Sloan School of Management at the Massachusetts Institute of Technology. He has authored and edited many books, three of which were coauthored with Nobel laureates, Franco Modigliani and Harry Markowitz. He has been the editor of the Journal of Portfolio Management since 1986 and is on the board of directors of the BlackRock complex of closed-end funds.

Early life and education
He earned a BA (magna cum laude) and an MA in economics from the City College of New York, both in 1970. He also earned a doctorate in economics from the City University of New York in 1972 . He is a Certified Public Accountant and holds the Chartered Financial Analyst designation.

Career
Fabozzi has written and edited books and numerous research papers covering topics in investment management and financial econometrics. Much of his earlier writing focused on fixed income securities and portfolio management with emphasis on mortgage- and asset-backed securities and structured products. He is a co-developer of the Kalotay–Williams–Fabozzi model of the short rate, used in the valuation of interest rate derivatives.

He is on the Advisory Council for the Department of Operations Research and Financial Engineering at Princeton University and an affiliated professor at the Institute of Statistics and Economics at the University of Karlsruhe (Germany). He has been the editor of the Journal of Portfolio Management since 1986 and is on the board of directors of the BlackRock complex of closed-end funds. Before joining EDHEC Business School, Fabozzi was a finance professor at Yale School of Management, and a visiting finance professor at the MIT Sloan School of Management.

Recognition
Fabozzi was elected to the Phi Beta Kappa Society in 1969. He was inducted into the Fixed Income Analysts Society's Hall of Fame in 2002 and was the 2007 recipient of the C. Stewart Sheppard Award given by The CFA Institute. He is the 2004 recipient of an Honorary Doctorate of Humane Letters from Nova Southeastern University.. In 2015, Fabozzi received the James R. Vertin Award from the CFA Institute Research Foundation, which recognizes individuals whose research is "notable for its relevance and enduring value to investment professionals".

Selected bibliography 
 Frank J. Fabozzi and Francesco A. Fabozzi (2021): Bond Markets, Analysis, and Strategies, tenth edition. The MIT Press, Cambridge, MA. ISBN 978-0-262-04627-5
 Fabozzi, Frank J.; Modigliani, Franco (2009). Capital Markets: Institutions and Instruments: 4th edition. Upper Saddle River, NJ: Prentice Hall.
 Fabozzi, Frank J.; Franco Modigliani; Frank J. Jones (2009). Foundations of Financial Markets and Institutions: 4th edition. Upper Saddle River, NJ: Prentice Hall.
 Fabozzi, Frank J. (2009). Bond Markets, Analysis and Strategies: 7th edition. Upper Saddle River, NJ: Prentice Hall.
 Rachev, Svetlozar T; John S.J. Hsu; Biliana Bagasheva; Frank J. Fabozzi (2008). Bayesian Methods in Finance. Hoboken, NJ: John Wiley & Sons.
 Fabozzi, Frank J.; Vinod Kothari (2008). Introduction to Securitization. Hoboken, NJ: John Wiley & Sons.
 Rachev, Svetlozar T; Stefan Mittnik; Frank J. Fabozzi; Sergio M. Focardi; Teo Jasic (2007). Financial Econometrics: From Basics to Advanced Modeling Techniques. Hoboken, NJ: John Wiley & Sons.
 Fabozzi, Frank J.; Petter N. Kolm; Dessislava Pachamanova; Sergio M. Focardi (2007). Robust Portfolio Optimization and Management. Hoboken, NJ: John Wiley & Sons.
 Fabozzi, Frank J. (2006). Fixed Income Mathematics: Analytical and Statistical Techniques: 4th edition. New York: NY: McGraw Hill Publishing.
 Fabozzi, Frank J.; Sergio M. Focardi; Petter N. Kolm (2006). Financial Modeling of the Equity Market: From CAPM to Cointegration. Hoboken, NJ: John Wiley & Sons.
 Fabozzi, Frank J.; Henry Davis; Moorad Choudhry (2006). Introduction to Structured Finance. Hoboken, NJ: John Wiley & Sons.
 Fabozzi, Frank J.; Harry M. Markowitz, Editors (2002). The Theory and Practice of Investment Management. Hoboken, NJ: Wiley.
 Fabozzi, Frank J.; Leibowitz, Martin L., Editors (2007). Fixed Income Analysis. John Wiley & Sons.

See also

Kalotay–Williams–Fabozzi model

References

External links
 
 The Frank J. Fabozzi Series at Wiley.com

Year of birth missing (living people)
Living people
Financial economists
MIT Sloan School of Management faculty
American people of Italian descent
CFA charterholders
Yale School of Management faculty
Academic staff of the Karlsruhe Institute of Technology
City College of New York alumni
City University of New York alumni
American financial writers
20th-century American economists
21st-century American economists